Hadoa chisosensis is a species of annual cicada in the genus Hadoa. It is native to the U.S. state of Texas.

References

Hemiptera of North America
Insects described in 1934
Cryptotympanini